Ann Veronica is a 1964 British television drama series which first aired on BBC 2. It is an adaptation of the 1909 novel of the same title by H.G. Wells. The title role of the Edwardian suffragette was played by Rosemary Nicols. An earlier television film of the novel had been made, starring Margaret Lockwood.

Cast
 Rosemary Nicols as Ann Veronica
 Gay Cameron as Hetty Widgett
 Jean Conroy as Emily
 Margaret Gordon as Miss Miniver
 Laurence Hardy as Mr. Stanley
 Gillian Lind as Miss Stanley
 Sheila Ballantine as  Kitty Brett
 Philip Bond as Mr. Capes
 Barrie Ingham as  Hubert Manning
 Kay Patrick as  Miss Garvice
 Alan Tilvern as  Edwin Ramage
 Kitty Atwood as  Mrs. Mudge
 Agnes Lauchlan as Lady Palsworthy
 George A. Cooper as Hotel Manager
 Ivor Salter as Police Sergeant Watts

References

Bibliography
Ellen Baskin. Serials on British Television, 1950-1994. Scolar Press, 1996.

External links
 

BBC television dramas
1964 British television series debuts
1964 British television series endings
English-language television shows
Television shows based on British novels